The Eternal derby of Bulgarian football or simply The Eternal derby is the name of the local derby football match between the two most popular and successful football clubs in Sofia and Bulgaria: Levski Sofia and CSKA Sofia. The dominant forces in Bulgarian football have won 26 and 31 national championship titles and 26 and 21 Bulgarian Cup titles, involved into 13 and 11 Doubles, respectively. The rivalry was chosen by COPA90 as the 2nd Maddest Derby in Eastern Europe.

History
The rivalry started in the late 1940s when the newly founded club of CSKA became a champion in their first year in competitive football in 1948. Both the 1948–49 and 1950 seasons ended with the two teams facing each other in Soviet Army Cup finals with Levski Sofia winning on both occasions after extra time of the second final replay, as the previous two final matches had finished as draws.

During the years, as the two teams became more and more successful, they gained large supporter bases. The confrontations between the clubs and their fans became commonplace and often resulted in tense encounters on the pitch and hooligan clashes between the fans off the pitch.

The hostility reached its climax on 19 June 1985 during the Bulgarian Cup final held at Vasil Levski National Stadium when, after many disputable referee decisions, both teams demonstrated poor sportsmanship which resulted in regular fights between them on the pitch. On 21 June, the Central Committee of the Bulgarian Communist Party issued a decree that disbanded both teams. CSKA Septemvriysko zname had to be re-founded as Sredets and Levski-Spartak as Vitosha. Six players (including Hristo Stoichkov and Borislav Mihaylov) were banned for life from playing competitive football; many other players and staff members were banned for three months to one year. A year later, the decision was abolished and the players continued their sport careers.

Although both Levski and CSKA are still regarded as the two most popular and supported teams in Bulgaria, neither of the two sides have been crowned champion after 2009. This has been mostly because of the rise of other clubs in the country, such as Litex Lovech and Ludogorets Razgrad. Litex won two consecutive titles between 2009 and 2011, while Ludogorets is currently on a streak of 11 consecutive titles since 2012. Despite this, the Eternal derby games are still usually the most attended ones in the league. In the 2010s, both CSKA and Levski experienced financial instability, with CSKA even being relegated to the third level of Bulgarian football after the 2014–15 season, while Levski has been in serious financial problems in the last couple of years, with multiple ownership changes.

Venues
During the years, all the matches between Levski and CSKA were held at a neutral venue, in most cases at the Vasil Levski National Stadium. During the 2000s the clubs started to play their eternal derby matches at their own stadiums Georgi Asparuhov and Balgarska Armia but soon they decided to move the matches between them back to the National Stadium because of its higher capacity and the damages done on club stadiums by the visiting supporters.

Only once in the history of the Eternal derby it was held outside Sofia – in 1991, Levski won the Bulgarian Cup quarter-final 2–0 in a match that was played at Tundzha Stadium in Yambol.

Summary of results

Note: All matches that have finished with a win after extra time are represented as a win for the respective club. All matches that have finished with a penalty shoot-out are represented as draws with the final score after 120 minutes.

As of 18 September 2022.

Matches list

A PFG / First League (1948–49 – present)

Bulgarian Cup and other

Trophies

Head-to-head ranking in First League (1948–2022)

• Total: CSKA with 44 higher finishes, Levski with 30 higher finishes (as of the end of the 2021–22 season).

Statistics

Biggest wins

Levski wins
7–1 – 23 September 1994, A PFG
7–2 – 17 November 1968, A PFG
5–0 – 13 May 1998, Bulgarian Cup final
4–0 – 16 June 1982, Bulgarian Cup final

CSKA wins
5–0 – 23 September 1953, A PFG; 1 October 1989, A PFG
4–0 – 14 April 1957, A PFG

Most appearances
35 – Manol Manolov (CSKA)
32 – Stefan Bozhkov (CSKA)
31 – Emil Spasov (Levski)

Most goals
15 – Georgi Ivanov (Levski)
14 – Nasko Sirakov (Levski)
12 – Pavel Panov (Levski)
11 – Dimitar Milanov (CSKA)

Most goals in one match
9 – Levski 6–3 CSKA (15 July 1962, A PFG); CSKA 2–7 Levski (17 November 1968, A PFG)

Most red cards
3 – Vladimir Gadzhev

Most yellow cards
11 – Todor Yanchev

Record attendances
Highest attendance: 70,000 – 11 March 1967, Vasil Levski National Stadium (final score Levski 1–1 CSKA) and 31 May 1969, Vasil Levski National Stadium (final score Levski 1–3 CSKA)
Lowest attendance: 8,000 – 18 November 1995, Vasil Levski National Stadium (final score Levski 3–1 CSKA) and 26 May 2002, Balgarska Armiya Stadium (final score CSKA 1–0 Levski)

Notes and references

Football derbies in Bulgaria
PFC Levski Sofia
PFC CSKA Sofia
1948 establishments in Bulgaria